Catherine was a Quebec sitcom that aired on Radio-Canada from 1999 to 2003. It tells the story of Catherine (Sylvie Moreau), a sexy, epicurean, man-crazy Montrealer in her thirties working at the advertising agency Mirage-Image, as well as the story of her best friend and orderly flatmate Sophie (Marie-Hélène Thibault), her landlord Rachel (Dominique Michel), her ex-boyfriend Pierre (Charles Lafortune) and other friends and co-workers.

See also 
Television of Quebec
List of Quebec television series

External links
Official website

Television shows filmed in Montreal
1999 Canadian television series debuts
2003 Canadian television series endings
Ici Radio-Canada Télé original programming
Television shows set in Montreal
1990s Canadian sitcoms
2000s Canadian sitcoms
1990s Canadian workplace comedy television series
2000s Canadian workplace comedy television series